Carly Waters (born 19 December 1995) is an American rugby union player. She is a Scrumhalf for the United States and for Sale Sharks in the Premier 15s.

Rugby career 
Waters began playing rugby in 2010 in High School as a full-back and went on to win three national titles for Penn State. She previously played for the Colorado Gray Wolves in the Women's Premier League in the U.S before signing with Saracens in the Premier 15s in England for the 2021–22 season. She was one of 43 players who took part in the Eagles three-week training camp in mid-June 2021.

Waters made her international debut for the United States against New Zealand at Chicago in November 2018.

Waters was selected in the Eagles squad for the 2021 Rugby World Cup in New Zealand. After the World Cup she will be joining Sale Sharks for the 2022–23 Premier 15s season.

References

External links 

 Eagles Profile

Living people
1995 births
Female rugby union players
American female rugby union players
United States women's international rugby union players